Zamora is on the west side of the Kettle River in the Boundary region of south central British Columbia.

Name origin
Why the Kettle Valley Railway, a Canadian Pacific Railway (CP) subsidiary, opened this station so close to Westbridge is unclear. Nobody appears to have lived in the vicinity until the late 1920s. In 1915, the station name changed from Zamaro to Zamora. The latter might be named after Zamora, Spain or the Spanish Province of Zamora, but no evidence substantiates either of these claims. Zamaro is more common as a surname than first name. CP sometimes named new stations after employees or their family members, but the early name change likely suggests the initial spelling was a mistake.

Railway
No evidence remains of the section house, which was immediately south of Zamora Rd. Passenger service ended in 1964. This part of the line closed to all traffic in 1973.

Zamora lies on the Kettle Valley Rail Trail.

Later community
Zamora Estates was an upscale bare-land strata development comprising 15 lots. Each of the  lots have river frontage. After the 1915 wildfire in the Rock Creek area, only one house remained standing in the Zamora subdivision, the remainder reduced to rubble.

See also
 showing Westbridge.
 showing the fire destruction from the trail.

References

Populated places in the Regional District of Kootenay Boundary